Ministry of Information and Broadcasting may refer to:

Ministry of Information and Broadcasting (Ghana)
Ministry of Information and Broadcasting (India), a branch of the Government of India
Ministry of Information and Broadcasting, merged into the Ministry of Information and Communication Technology (Namibia), a branch of the Government of Namibia, in 2008 
Ministry of Information & Broadcasting (Pakistan)
Ministry of Information and Broadcasting (South Sudan), a branch of the Government of South Sudan

See also
Ministry of Information, Broadcasting and National Heritage (Pakistan), a branch of the Government of Pakistan
Ministry of Information (disambiguation)